The Shinkansen Henkei Robo Shinkalion anime series features an extensive cast of characters designed by Yuka Aono.

Main characters
Mainly the drivers from Shinkansen Ultra Evolution Institute Ōmiya Branch. Also known as Team Ōmiya.

Ex-driver of the Shinkalion E5 Hayabusa and current driver of the Shinkalion E5 Hayabusa MkII. An 11-year-old who lives in Ōmiya, Saitama Prefecture.

Driver of the Shinkalion E6 Komachi. An 11-year-old who hails from Kitaakita, Akita Prefecture.

Driver of the Shinkalion E7 Kagayaki. An 11-year-old who hails from Kanazawa, Ishikawa Prefecture.

Hayato's partner. A Conductor Robot with Deep learning functioned AI specially built for Shinkanlion E5 Hayabusa.

Driver of the Shinkalion E3 Tsubasa and Shinkalion E3 Tsubasa Iron Wing. A 10-year-old who lives in Yonezawa, Yamagata Prefecture.

Azusa is a popular elementary school YouTuber and a classmate of Hayato. She is the only member of Team Omiya who is not a Shinkalion driver.

Driver of Black Shinkalion. He was formerly a Kitoralsus agent, but eventually joins the institute since episode 55. Currently lives in Azusa’s home.

Supporting cast

Other Shinkalion Drivers

Tokai Command Office Nagoya Branch

Ex-driver of the Shikalion N700A Nozomi and current driver of the Shinkalion Doctor Yellow. A 14-year-old who lives in Nagoya, Aichi Prefecture.

Ryūji’s younger brother and the second driver of the Shikalion N700A Nozomi. A 12-year-old who lives in Nagoya, Aichi Prefecture.

Hokkaido Command Office Hokkaido Branch 

Driver of the Shinkalion H5 Hayabusa. An 11-year-old who lives in Sapporo, Hokkaido. She is designed and named after a character of the same name from the Vocaloid series, but with a different spelling (初音 versus 発音).

Kyushu Command Office Moji Branch 

Driver of the Shinkalion 800 Tsubame. A 9-year-old who lives in Kitakyushu, Fukuoka Prefecture.

Driver of the Shinkalion N700 Mizuho. A 12-year-old who lives in Kagoshima, Kagoshima Prefecture.

West Japan Command Office Kyoto Branch

Driver of the Shinkalion 700 Hikari Railstar. An 11-year-old and twin brother to Jō who lives in Yamaguchi Prefecture.

Driver of the Shinkalion 700 Nozomi. An 11-year-old and twin brother to Gin who lives in Yamaguchi Prefecture.

Shinkansen Ultra Evolution Institute Staff Members

East Japan Command Office Ōmiya Branch

Father of Hayato and Haruka. Director of Shinkansen Ultra Evolution Institute Ōmiya Branch. Later becomes the driver of Shinkalion 500 Kodama and Shinkalion 923 Doctor Yellow.

Commander of Shinkansen Ultra Evolution Institute Ōmiya Branch.

One of the operators of Shinkansen Ultra Evolution Institute Ōmiya Branch. After Hokuto’s transference to Kyoto, she becomes the Acting Director of the Ōmiya Branch.

One of the operators of Shinkansen Ultra Evolution Institute Ōmiya Branch.

One of the operators of Shinkansen Ultra Evolution Institute Ōmiya Branch.

One of the operators of Shinkansen Ultra Evolution Institute Ōmiya Branch.

Researcher of Shinkansen Ultra Evolution Institute Ōmiya Branch.

Medical personnel of Shinkansen Ultra Evolution Institute Ōmiya Branch.

Mechanic of Shinkansen Ultra Evolution Institute Ōmiya Branch.

Mechanic of Shinkansen Ultra Evolution Institute Ōmiya Branch.

West Japan Command Office Kyoto Branch

Operator and trainer of Shinkansen Ultra Evolution Institute Kyoto Branch.

Tokai Command Office Nagoya Branch

Commander of Shinkansen Ultra Evolution Institute Tokai Branch.

Operator of Shinkansen Ultra Evolution Institute Tokai Branch.

Hokkaido Command Office Hokkaido Branch

Commander of Shinkansen Ultra Evolution Institute Hokkaido Branch.

Operator of Shinkansen Ultra Evolution Institute Hokkaido Branch.

Kyushu Command Office Moji Branch

Commander of Shinkansen Ultra Evolution Institute Moji Branch.

Operator and trainer of Shinkansen Ultra Evolution Institute Moji Branch.

General Command Office

The chief commander of Shinkansen Ultra Evolution Institute.

Secretary general of Shinkansen Ultra Evolution Institute General Command Office.

Subaru’s pet penguin. It is based on the mascot of Suica, a type of JR East IC card.

Other supporting characters

Hayasugi Family

Wife of Hokuto and Mother of Hayato & Haruka.

Hayato's younger sister.

Ueda Family

Father of Azusa.

Omiya Elementary School

Homeroom teacher of Hayato, Akita, Tsuranuki and Azusa.

Oga Family

Mother of Akita Oga.

Grandfather of Akita.

Daimonyama Family

Mother of Tsuranuki, Kagari and Kenroku.

Tsuranuki’s younger sister.

Tsuranuki’s younger brother.

Tsukiyama Family

Mother of Shinobu Tsukiyama.

Kiyosu Family

Father of Ryūji, Tatsumi and Miu.

Mother of Ryūji, Tatsumi and Miu.

Ryūji and Tatsumi’s younger sister.

Kirishima Family

Father of Takatora Kirishima.

Kurashiki Family

Kitoralsus
 is an ancient humanoid species who live in the underground world.

The Agents

The second driver of the Shinkalion E5 Hayabusa.

The only female Kitoralsus Agent.

The Old Generation Agents

Voiced by: Kenji Yamauchi

The leader of the old generation Kitoralsus Agents.

Others

A mysterious old man who secretly instructs the Agents. His true identity is a human named , the former leader of Shinkansen Ultra Evolution Institute.

The driver of Black Shinkalion Ogre.

Valhallan

Main characters (Movie)

Driver of the Shinkalion ALFA-X. A 9-year-old counterpart of Hokuto Hayasugi from another timeline who was brought to Hayato's world by accident.

Main characters (Shinkansen Henkei Robo Shinkalion Z)

Driver of the Shinkalion Z E5 Hayabusa. An 11-year-old who lives in Tabata, Tokyo.

Driver of the Dark Shinkalion. An 11-year-old who lives in Yokokawa, Gunma Prefecture. He is a half-Human, half-Teoti boy.

Shin's partner. A robot converted from the Ultra Evolution Mobile Z Gear.

Driver of the Shinkalion Z E6 Komachi. An 11-year-old who hails from Ōmagari, Akita Prefecture.

Driver of the Shinkalion Z E7 Kagayaki. An 11-year-old who hails from Kiso, Nagano Prefecture.

Supporting casts (Shinkansen Henkei Robo Shinkalion Z)

Other Shinkalion Z Drivers

Driver of the Shinkalion Z 800 Tsubame. A 12-year-old who hails from Fukuoka, Fukuoka Prefecture.

Driver of the Shinkalion Z N700S Nozomi. A 10-year-old who hails from Nagoya, Aichi Prefecture.

Nagara's older brother and the co-driver of the Shinkalion Z N700S Nozomi and current driver of the Shinkalion Z Doctor Yellow. A 12-year-old who hails from Nagoya, Aichi Prefecture.

Driver of the Shinkalion Z 500 Kodama. An 11-year-old who hails from Kyoto, Kyoto Prefecture.

Driver of the Shinkalion Z H5 Hayabusa. An 11-year-old who hails from Oshamambe, Hokkaido. She is designed and named after a character of the same name from the Galaxy Express 999 franchise.

Shinkansen Ultra Evolution Institute Yokokawa Branch

Commander of Shinkansen Ultra Evolution Institute Yokokawa Branch.

Head mechanic of Shinkansen Ultra Evolution Institute Yokokawa Branch.

Instructor of Shinkansen Ultra Evolution Institute Yokokawa Branch.

Operator of Shinkansen Ultra Evolution Institute Yokokawa Branch.

One of the mechanics of Shinkansen Ultra Evolution Institute Yokokawa Branch.

Shinkansen Ultra Evolution Institute Iyo-Saijō Branch

Commander of Shinkansen Ultra Evolution Institute Iyo-Saijō Branch.

Arata Family

Shin's older sister.

Shin's father.

Shin's mother.

Usui Family

Abuto's mother.

Ōmagari Family

Hanabi's father.

Hanabi's mother.

Togakushi Family

Taiju's father.

Taiju's mother.

Taiju's grandfather.

Nakasu Family

Yamakasa's father.

Yamakasa's mother.

Anjō Family

Nagara and Shimakaze's father.

Arashiyama Family

Ginga's father.

Ginga's mother.

Teoti

He is the Crown prince of Teoti and Astrea's twin younger brother.

Her true identity is a member of Teoti and Kannagi's twin older sister named .

Abuto's father. His true identity is a member of Teoti named .

Neon Genesis Evangelion Crossover Characters
All the characters here originated from the Neon Genesis Evangelion franchise.

Shinkansen Ultra Evolution Institute Kyoto Branch

Driver of the Shinkalion 500 TYPE EVA and Shinkalion Z 500 TYPE EVA.

Trainer of Shinkansen Ultra Evolution Institute Kyoto Branch.

Tokyo-3 Residents

Hikari’s younger sister.

Hikari and Nozomi’s older sister.

Others

Shinji's father.

References 

Shinkansen Henkei Robo Shinkalion